Vishal Pandya is an Indian film director and screenwriter, who has directed Hate Story 2, Hate Story 3, Wajah Tum Ho & Hate Story 4 under the production house of T-Series He recently directed Poison 2, an original ZEE5 thriller series that was released on 30 April 2020

Career

Directorial Debut: Three: Love, Lies, Betrayal
Vishal Pandya's made his directorial debut with Three: Love, Lies, Betrayal in 2009.

2014
After 5 years got second chance in the 2014 erotic thriller film Hate Story 2, which was produced by T-Series owner Bhushan Kumar and Vikram Bhatt. The film was a sequel to the 2012 sleeper hit Hate Story. The film's nett gross was 22.90 crore and was declared "Average" by the Box Office India.

2015 (Box Office Success)
After the success of Hate Story 2, Pandya directed the 2015 erotic thriller Hate Story 3. The film was the third installment of Hate Story (film series). The film was declared as a "Hit" by the Box Office India.

2016
He wrote and directed the 2016 erotic thriller Wajah Tum Ho. Despite being made on a small budget of 14 crore, the film failed to perform well at the box office and was also declared as a "Flop" by the Box Office India.

2018

In 2018, he directed Hate Story 4 which opened with mixed to negative reviews.

2020-present 
Vishal Pandya directed Poison 2, a ZEE5 Original Indian Hindi crime thriller web series. The Hindustan Times gave a review of the series by praising the hard-core action scenes and gripping plot that does justice to the thriller series.

Filmography

Films

Webseries

References

Hindi-language film directors
21st-century Indian film directors
Living people
Year of birth missing (living people)